Centrum was a city district in the north of Malmö Municipality, Sweden. On 1 July 2013, it was merged with Kirseberg, forming Norr. In 2012, Centrum had a population of 47,171 of the municipality's 307,758. The area was 1,757 hectares.

Neighbourhoods
The neighbourhoods of Centrum were:

References

Former city districts of Malmö